The 1971 First National Tennis Classic, also known as the Louisville WCT, was a men's tennis tournament played on outdoor clay courts at the Louisville Tennis Center in Louisville, Kentucky, United States. It was the second edition of the tournament and was held from July 19 through July 25, 1971. The tournament was part of the 1971 World Championship Tennis circuit and offered total prize money of $50,000. The singles final was won by Tom Okker who earned $10,000 first-prize money.

Finals

Singles
 Tom Okker defeated  Cliff Drysdale 3–6, 6–4, 6–1

Doubles
 Ken Rosewall /  Fred Stolle and  Roy Emerson /  Rod Laver not played, divided

References

External links
 ITF tournament edition details

Louisville Open
First National Tennis Classic
First National Tennis Classic
First National Tennis Classic